The Men's junior time trial of the 2014 UCI Road World Championships took place in and around Ponferrada, Spain on 23 September 2014.

Lennard Kämna became the first German rider to win the world title since Marcel Kittel in 2006, with a winning margin of almost 45 seconds over his nearest competitor. The silver medal went to American rider Adrien Costa, with the bronze medal going to Australia's Michael Storer; Costa and Storer were the only riders to get within a minute of Kämna's time.

Qualification

All National Federations were allowed to enter four riders for the race, with a maximum of two riders to start. In addition to this number, the outgoing World Champion and the current continental champions were also able to take part.

For the event, competing riders used numbers 2 to 70, as number 1 was left unused.  Number 1 was scheduled to be worn by the defending World Champion, Igor Decraene, but three weeks prior to the championships – on 30 August 2014 – Decraene was killed in Zulte, Belgium, while returning from a house party.

Course
The time trial started in the centre of Ponferrada and passed through La Martina, Posada del Bierzo and Carracedelo before returning to Ponferrada. A short stretch before riding into Ponferrada was made for the championships.

Schedule
All times are in Central European Time (UTC+1).

Participating nations
69 cyclists from 40 nations took part in the men's junior time trial. The number of cyclists per nation is shown in parentheses.

  Algeria (2)
  Argentina (1)
  Australia (1)
  Azerbaijan (2)
  Belgium (2)
  Belarus (2)
  Brazil (1)
  Canada (1)
  Colombia (2)
  Denmark (2)
  Ecuador (1)
  Egypt (2)
  Estonia (2)
  France (2)
  Great Britain (1)
  Germany (3)
  Hungary (1)
  Ireland (2)
  Italy (2)
  Japan (1)
  Kazakhstan (2)
  Luxembourg (2)
  Morocco (2)
  Macedonia (1)
  Norway (2)
  Poland (2)
  Portugal (2)
  Romania (1)
  Russia (2)
  Slovakia (1)
  Slovenia (2)
  South Africa (2)
  Spain (2) (host)
  Sweden (2)
  Switzerland (2)
  Turkey (2)
  Ukraine (2)
  Uruguay (1)
  United States (2)
  Uzbekistan (2)

Prize money
The UCI assigned premiums for the top 3 finishers with a total prize money of €1,380.

Final classification

References

Men's junior time trial
UCI Road World Championships – Men's junior time trial
2014 in men's road cycling